Calliostoma sugitanii is a species of sea snail, a marine gastropod mollusk in the family Calliostomatidae.

Some authors place this taxon in the subgenus Calliostoma (Tristichotrochus).

Description

Distribution

References

 Sakurai, K. (1994). Eight new species of Trochid Genera, Tristichotrochus, Kombologion and Otukaia (Calliostomatinae) from Japan and adjacent waters.. Jap. Jour. Malac. (4) 53 : 287–296

External links

sugitanii
Gastropods described in 1994